Andrew Lawrence Cooper (born March 10, 1985), known professionally as Cooper Andrews, is an American actor. He is best known for his role as Jerry on The Walking Dead.

Early life
Andrews was born in Smithtown, New York on Long Island. His father is Samoan and his mother is of Hungarian Jewish descent. He grew up with his mother, and was raised Jewish. Andrews lived in Atlanta for many years and is a graduate of Dunwoody High School.

Career
Andrews played the recurring character Yo-Yo Engberk in the first three seasons in AMC's Halt and Catch Fire. He went on to be cast as Jerry in The Walking Dead and Víctor Vásquez in Shazam!. Andrews has also worked behind the camera as boom operator, stunt coordinator and assistant director.

Filmography

Film

Television

Video Games

References

External links
 
 

1985 births
20th-century American male actors
21st-century American male actors
20th-century American Jews
American male film actors
American male television actors
American male voice actors
American people of Hungarian-Jewish descent
American people of Samoan descent
Actors of Samoan descent
Living people
21st-century American Jews